Cisco is an unincorporated community in Murray County, Georgia, United States. Cisco has a post office with ZIP code 30708.

History
A post office called Cisco has been in operation since 1881. The community's name is a shortening and alteration of the name of "Cis" Cockburn, a local storekeeper.

References

Unincorporated communities in Murray County, Georgia
Unincorporated communities in Georgia (U.S. state)